Sup'ung station is a railway station of the Korean State Railway in Sup'ung Workers' District, Sakchu County, North P'yŏngan Province, North Korea; it is the terminus of the Sup'ung Line of the Korean State Railway.

History
Sup'ung station, along with the rest of the Sup'ung Line, was opened by the P'yŏngbuk Railway on 27 September 1939.

Services
Sup'ung station is served by six pairs of commuter trains that run along the Ch'ongsu–Sup'ung–P'ungnyŏn route.

References

Railway stations in North Korea